The Kanwaka Formation is a geologic formation in Iowa. It preserves fossils dating back to the Carboniferous period.

See also

 List of fossiliferous stratigraphic units in Iowa
 Paleontology in Iowa

References
 

Carboniferous Kansas
Carboniferous Iowa
Carboniferous geology of Nebraska
Carboniferous southern paleotropical deposits